Abandoned to God is a contemporary Christian music album released by Steve Camp in 1999. This was the only album Camp released on the small Ministry Music label, and was released a year after Camp publicized his 107 Theses that he felt were needed for reformation in the contemporary Christian music industry. This album also features a then-little known Natalie Grant as a background vocalist. This is also the first album since Consider the Cost in 1991 that did not feature a remake of an earlier song. "Pledge My Head To Heaven" is a song originally performed by Keith Green, written for his 1980 album, So You Wanna Go Back To Egypt.

Track listing 
Streams In The Desert
Cornerstone
My America
The Mark Of A Man Of God
The Center Of The Father's Will
Pilgrim's Progress
Abandoned To God
Pounding On Wittenberg's Door
The Ministry
'Til I Lost Myself In You
Man Of God
Pledge My Head To Heaven
The Shepherd
Here I Stand

References 

1999 albums
Steve Camp albums